Comikaze was the second EP by Australian pop singer Kate Miller-Heidke, released in 2005. The EP was limited to a pressing of just 500 copies. According to a 2007 interview, Miller-Heidke cut further release of the EP because she saw its comedic material as a mistake.

The tracks "Australian Idol" and "Dreams / I Love You" were re-recorded on the 2016 album The Best of Kate Miller-Heidke: Act One.

In 2006, Miller-Heidke said she wrote "Australian Idol" as a joke, saying "It's basically a spoof, making fun of all the people that tell me I should go on Australian Idol. I get that about once a week. It's a shame but most people think that's what singing is and that's what being a musician is. I think auditioning for Australian Idol would destroy my credibility with one fell swoop."

Track listing

Release history

References

2005 EPs
Kate Miller-Heidke albums
EPs by Australian artists